This article lists events from the year 2020 in Niger.

Incumbents
President: Mahamadou Issoufou
Prime Minister: Brigi Rafini

Events
January 9 – Insurgency in the Maghreb: Battle of Chinagodrar.
March 19 – The first case of COVID-19 was confirmed in Niger.
May 9 – May 2020 Tillabéri attacks.
May 18 – Boko Haram militants attacked the Blabrine military base near Diffa, killing twelve Nigerien soldiers. Seven militants were also killed in the attack.
August 9 – Gunmen killed six French volunteers with ACTED, along with two Nigeriens, in the Tillabéri Region.
October 27 - An American citizen was kidnapped in Birni-N'Konni.
December 14 – Boko Haram claims responsibility for 27 deaths in Toumour, Diffa.
December 27 – 2020 Nigerien general election.

Deaths
May 5 – Mohamed Ben Omar, Labor Minister (b. 1965).
November 24 – Mamadou Tandja, 82, politician, President (1999–2010).
December 16 – Abdallah Wafy, Ambassador of Niger to the United States.
December 24 – Issaka Assane Karanta, 75, politician, Mayor of Commune I (1996–1999) and Commune III (2010–2011) of Niamey, Governor of Niamey Capital District (since 2018), COVID-19.

See also
2020 in West Africa
COVID-19 pandemic in Niger

References

 
Niger
2020s in Niger
Years of the 21st century in Niger

External links
Niger: Election just the start of challenges for new president (DW, Dec. 22, 2020)